Boyce Lephimotswe Sebetela is a Botswanan politician who formerly served as a member of the Pan-African Parliament and Parliament of Botswana representing Palapye, and has served as Botswana’s first Chief of Staff since 2021. Previously, he worked as Head of Strategy for Debswana.

References

Botswana politicians
Year of birth missing (living people)
Living people
Members of the Pan-African Parliament from Botswana